Bollands may refer to:

The Bollands, a folk music band

People with the surname
John Bollands (born 1935), English footballer

See also
Bolland, a surname